Hidden Agenda is a 1990 political thriller film directed by Ken Loach with a screenplay by Jim Allen. The film stars Frances McDormand, Brian Cox, Brad Dourif, Maurice Roëves, Ian McElhinney, Mai Zetterling and Michelle Fairley. The plot follows the investigation of a killing in Northern Ireland by British security forces.

Plot
The film begins with a quote from British Prime Minister Margaret Thatcher insisting that Northern Ireland is part of Britain. It ends with one from a former British intelligence agent, stating, "There are two laws running this country: one for the security forces and the other for the rest of us."

In Northern Ireland, an Orange walk is held on The Twelfth, and an audio tape is handed to Paul Sullivan (Dourif), an American human rights lawyer and activist. When Sullivan arranges ro meet the person who made the tape, he is assassinated by a death squad. The gunmen retrieve the tape from Sullivan's body. It subsequently becomes clear that the killers are from the British security services.

British police investigator Peter Kerrigan (Cox), with the help of Sullivan's assistant, Ingrid Jessner (McDormand), investigates the death. The investigation leads them to Captain Harris, an ex-army intelligence officer now in hiding, who created the tape. He reveals it was a recording of senior military leaders and Conservative Party politicians discussing how they subverted democracy to facilitate Margaret Thatcher's rise to power.

Harris gives a copy of the tape to Jessner, after which British security forces kill Harris and blame his death on the IRA. Kerrigan is blackmailed into silence. Jessner has the tape, but without Harris to authenticate it, the recording is dismissed as a forgery.

Cast
 Frances McDormand as Ingrid Jessner
 Brian Cox as Peter Kerrigan
 Brad Dourif as Paul Sullivan
 Maurice Roëves as Captain Harris
 Ian McElhinney as Jack Cunningham
 Mai Zetterling as Moa
 Michelle Fairley as Teresa Doyle

the film also features a cameo by the socialist politician John McDonnell as 'Labour MP'.

Production
The production was originally set up at Columbia Pictures in 1987, when David Puttnam ran the studio. After Puttnam was ousted, Loach had to find new financial backing, and eventually found it with John Daly who ran Hemdale Film Corporation.

Soundtrack
Joe McDonnell (hunger striker) - Written by Brian Warfield - Re-arranged by Ron Kavana - Performed by Ron Kavana and Terry Woods
Young Ned of the Hill - Written and performed by Ron Kavana and Terry Woods

Reception

Critical response
Hidden Agenda was praised for its honesty and complexity, as well as its resonance. It was criticised for portraying the Troubles as an adjunct to British rather than Irish politics.

Roger Ebert gave the film 3 stars out of 4, describing it as "lacerating" and a "superior thriller", although he noted that "for Americans, it works more as a thriller than as political polemic".

Rotten Tomatoes retrospectively collected 20 reviews, amassing an approval rating of 85%, with an average rating of 6.9/10.

Box Office
The film made £141,050 in the UK.

Awards

Hidden Agenda won the Jury Prize at the 1990 Cannes Film Festival and was nominated for Best European Film at the Goya Awards. At the Festival press conference, the Northern Irish critic Alexander Walker publicly denounced the film as IRA propaganda.

References

External links
 
 
 

1990s political thriller films
Northern Irish films
Films about The Troubles (Northern Ireland)
Films directed by Ken Loach
Films produced by Eric Fellner
Films scored by Stewart Copeland
Films set in Northern Ireland
British political thriller films
1990s English-language films
1990s British films